Lüsslingen-Nennigkofen is a municipality in the district of Bucheggberg, in the canton of Solothurn, Switzerland.  On 1 January 2013, Lüsslingen and Nennigkofen merged to form Lüsslingen-Nennigkofen.

History
Lüsslingen is first mentioned in 1251 as in Luslingen.  Nennigkofen is first mentioned in 1392 as Nennikofen or Nennikoven.

Geography

Of this area,  or 55.2% is used for agricultural purposes, while  or 26.6% is forested. The former municipality is located on the northern slope of Bucheggberg mountain. It is the closest municipality to Solothurn in the Bucheggberg district.

Of this area,  or 64.3% is used for agricultural purposes, while  or 24.0% is forested. The former municipality is located in the Bucheggberger Aare valley.

Climate
Characterized by equable climates with few extremes of temperature and ample precipitation in all months.  The Köppen Climate Classification subtype for this climate is "Cfb". (Marine West Coast Climate).

Demographics

Historic Population
The historical population is given in the following chart:

References

Municipalities of the canton of Solothurn